Alex Healy may refer to:

Alex Healy (racing driver) (born 1989), Canadian racing driver
Alex Healy (EastEnders), fictional soap opera character